Captain David George Armytage CBE (4 September 1929 – 2 February 2015) was a Royal Navy officer who was a specialist in the use of radar and commanded several frigates. He took part in the "Cod Wars".

References

Royal Navy officers of World War II
1929 births
2015 deaths
Commanders of the Order of the British Empire